Robert Hume Cochrane (July 9, 1924 – May 7, 2010) was bishop of the Diocese of Olympia in the Episcopal Church, serving from 1976 until his retirement in 1990.  A graduate of the General Theological Seminary, he was consecrated on January 25, 1976.

External links 
Bishop Robert Cochrane of Olympia remembered for evangelism, helping those in need
Obituary

1924 births
2010 deaths
General Theological Seminary alumni
20th-century American Episcopalians
Episcopal bishops of Olympia